Miss Earth Ethiopia is the official title given to Ethiopia's delegate to the Miss Earth pageant. The reigning titleholders dedicate their year to promote environmental projects and to address issues concerning the environment.

History
The first year Ethiopia sent a representative to Miss Earth was in 2001 with Nardos Tiluhan Wondemu as the first Miss Earth Ethiopia titleholder.

In 2003 the  Miss Earth Ethiopia franchise was obtained by Beauties of Africa Inc, owned by Andy A. Abulime. Miss Earth Ethiopia 2003 Yodit Getahun participated in Miss Earth 2003 and won the Miss Friendship special award. Getahun was later dethroned and replaced by Muna Kidane-Mariam.

From 2003-2008, the Ethiopian representative to Miss Earth was usually the winner of Miss Universe Ethiopia or from the Miss Millennium Queen pageant.

Ethiopia failed to attend the Miss Earth pageant in 2002, 2005, 2009, and 2010.

Delegates

References

Ethiopia
Beauty pageants in Ethiopia
Ethiopian awards